Longfeng (16 March 1355 – January 1367) was the era name of Han Lin'er (韓林兒; Young Prince of Radiance 小明王), who was a rebel and emperor of Han Song during the Yuan dynasty of China, and was used for a total of 12 years. After Han Lin'er's death, his subordinate Zhu Yuanzhang, Prince of Wu, changed the next year (1367) to "Wu 1" (吳元年, "the first year of the Wu era"), and in 1368 (Wu 2), to "Hongwu", and established the Ming dynasty.

Change of era
 16 March 1355 (1355, 2nd day of the 2nd month): Han Lin'er ascended the throne as emperor of the Song dynasty with the era name Longfeng.
 January 1367 (1366, 12th month): Zhu Yuanzhang sent Liao Yongzhong (廖永忠) to welcome Han Lin'er to Yingtian Prefecture. Han Lin'er's boat sank while crossing the Yangtze River, and Han Lin'er was killed.

See also
 List of Chinese era names

References

Further reading

Chinese imperial eras